Bakhtegan (also Romanized as Bakhtegān; also known as Bakhtegān-e ‘Olyā) is a village in Mongasht Rural District, in the Central District of Bagh-e Malek County, Khuzestan Province, Iran. At the 2006 census, its population was 1,107, in 185 families.

References 

Populated places in Bagh-e Malek County